Hewlett-Packard Journal was a magazine published by Hewlett-Packard (HP) between 1949–1998. The first issue appeared in September 1949. Headquartered in Palo Alto, California, it covered technical and product news from HP. The magazine was started as monthly, but then its frequency switched to bimonthly. It is available as web-pages - or as scanned and available on HPs home page as PDF downloads.

References

External links
 hpmemoryproject.org: The Hewlett-Packard Journal
 leapsecond.com: Time & Frequency Articles from Hewlett Packard Journal

Bimonthly magazines published in the United States
Monthly magazines published in the United States
Defunct computer magazines published in the United States
Hewlett-Packard
Magazines disestablished in 1998
Magazines established in 1949
Magazines published in California